Evenings is a 1989 Dutch film directed by Rudolf van den Berg. It is based on the novel of the same title by Gerard Reve. The film was selected as the Dutch entry for the Best Foreign Language Film at the 63rd Academy Awards, but was not accepted as a nominee.

Leading roles were played by Thom Hoffman, Rijk de Gooyer and Pierre Bokma.

The film won two Golden Calf awards: best film, best actor (Thom Hoffman).

Plot
The film follows Frits van Egters in the days before New Years 1947.

Cast
 Thom Hoffman as Frits van Egters
 Rijk de Gooyer as Father
 Viviane de Muynck as Mother
 Pierre Bokma as Maurits

See also
 List of submissions to the 63rd Academy Awards for Best Foreign Language Film
 List of Dutch submissions for the Academy Award for Best Foreign Language Film

References

External links 
 

Dutch biographical drama films
1989 films
Films based on Dutch novels
Films set in the Netherlands
Netherlands in fiction
1980s Dutch-language films